was an American sociologist, best known for his principled resistance to the Japanese American internment during World War II, and the court case which bears his name, Hirabayashi v. United States.

Early life
Hirabayashi was born in Seattle to a Christian family who was associated with the Mukyōkai Christian Movement. He graduated from Auburn Senior High School in Auburn, Washington, and in 1937 went to the University of Washington, where he received his degree. At the University he participated in the YMCA and became a religious pacifist.

Resistance to internment, discrimination and war

Although Hirabayashi had originally considered accepting internment, he ultimately became one of three to openly defy it. He joined the Quaker-run American Friends Service Committee. In 1942 he turned himself in to the FBI, and after being convicted for curfew violation was sentenced to 90 days in prison. He invited prosecution with the intention of challenging the legality of internment in the appellate courts. The ACLU initially denied support, which was instead provided by an independent committee organized by Washington State Senator Mary Farquharson. When Hirabayashi's case reached the U.S. Supreme Court the ACLU took an active part. One of his lawyers was the Philadelphia Quaker attorney Harold Evans. The Supreme Court unanimously ruled against him in Hirabayashi v. United States (1943), albeit with three Justices filing separate opinions that concurred with the Court's decision only with certain reservations.

Given wartime exigencies, officials would not transport him to prison or even pay his train fare, so he hitchhiked to the prison in Arizona where he had been ordered to serve his sentence. Once there, wardens stated they lacked the sufficient papers as he was two weeks late. They considered letting him just go home, but he feared this would look suspicious. After that they made the suggestion he could go out for dinner and a movie, which would give them time to find his papers. He agreed to this and, by the time he finished doing so, they had found the relevant paperwork.

Hirabayashi later spent a year in federal prison at McNeil Island Penitentiary for refusing induction into the armed forces, contending that a questionnaire sent to Japanese Americans demanding renunciation of allegiance to the emperor of Japan was racially discriminatory because other ethnic groups were not asked about adherence to foreign leaders.

Post-war career
After the war, he went on to earn B.A., M.A. and Ph.D. degrees in sociology from the University of Washington. He taught in Beirut, Lebanon and Cairo, Egypt, before settling at the University of Alberta in Canada in 1959, where he served as chair of the sociology department from 1970 until 1975 and continued to teach until his retirement in 1983. As a sociologist he did studies of Jordan and the Doukhobors in British Columbia, Egyptian village political awareness, Jordanian social change, and Asian-Americans. He was an active member of Canadian Yearly Meeting of the Religious Society of Friends (Quakers). After retirement he was active on behalf of human rights.

Hirabayashi died on January 2, 2012, at age 93, in Edmonton, Alberta. He had been diagnosed with Alzheimer's disease 11 years earlier.

Conviction overturned
Soon after retiring, Hirabayashi received a call that would prove consequential. Peter Irons, a political science professor from the University of California, San Diego, had uncovered documents that clearly showed evidence of government misconduct in 1942—evidence that the government knew there was no military reason for the exclusion order but withheld that information from the United States Supreme Court. With this new information, Hirabayashi's case was reheard by the federal courts, and in 1987 the Court of Appeals for the Ninth Circuit granted a writ of coram nobis which overturned his criminal conviction (Hirabayashi v. United States (1987)).

"It was quite a strong victory—so strong that the other side did not appeal," says Hirabayashi. "It was a vindication of all the effort people had put in for the rights of citizens during crisis periods."

"There was a time when I felt that the Constitution failed me," he explains. "But with the reversal in the courts and in public statements from the government, I feel that our country has proven that the Constitution is worth upholding. The U.S. government admitted it made a mistake. A country that can do that is a strong country. I have more faith and allegiance to the Constitution than I ever had before."

"I would also say that if you believe in something, if you think the Constitution is a good one, and if you think the Constitution protects you, you better make sure that the Constitution is actively operating... and uh, in other words "constant vigilance". Otherwise, it's a scrap of paper. We had the Constitution to protect us in 1942. It didn't because the will of the people weren't behind it."

In 1999, the Coronado National Forest in Arizona renamed the former Catalina Honor Camp in Hirabayashi's honor. The site, ten miles northeast of Tucson, where Hirabayashi had served out his sentence of hard labor in 1942, is now known as the Gordon Hirabayashi Recreation Site.

In 2008, the University of Washington awarded Hirabayashi and four hundred former students of Japanese ancestry who were evacuated from the school honorary degrees "nunc pro tunc" (retroactively). Although Hirabayashi did not attend the ceremony, when his name was called he received the loudest and longest ovation from the audience.

On May 24, 2011, the U.S. Acting Solicitor General, Neal Katyal delivered the keynote speech at the Department of Justice's Great Hall marking Asian American and Pacific Islander Heritage Month. Developing comments he had posted officially on May 20, Katyal issued the Justice Department's first public confession of its 1942 ethics lapse. He cited the Hirabayashi and Korematsu cases as blots on the reputation of the Office of the Solicitor General – whom the Supreme Court explicitly considers as deserving of "special credence" when arguing cases – and as "an important reminder" of the need for absolute candor in arguing the United States government's position on every case.

Public honors

U.S.D.A. Forest Service memorial
In 1999, the former Catalina Federal Honor Camp near Tucson, Arizona, where Hirabayashi was sentenced to hard labor in the 1940s, was renamed the Gordon Hirabayashi Recreation Site. Located within the Coronado National Forest, the site offers a public campground.

A chapter in the fight for Constitutional rights spotlighted at Chicago's Asian Pacific events

The United States Immigration & Naturalization Service (USINS) Chicago District Office commemorated Asian Pacific Heritage month with back-to-back observances that presented a first-hand account of the injustices suffered by persons of Japanese ancestry during World War II.

Gordon Hirabayashi, who in 1942 challenged a curfew imposed on persons of Japanese descent, was the keynote speaker for a program on June 4 at Chicago's O'Hare International Airport. The program was repeated the following day in the Ceremonial Courtroom of the US District Court for Northern District of Illinois, Dirksen Federal Building, located next door to the USINS Chicago District Office.

The U.S. Constitution is more than a mere piece of paper, Hirabayashi said. Attempts to violate the Constitution's ideals should be taken personally, and opposed firmly.

His personal fight to defend constitutional rights in the face of wartime hysteria was described in detail in a Public Broadcasting Service (PBS) documentary about his court case. The piece, entitled "A Personal Matter – Gordon Hirabayashi vs. United States", was screened at both programs.

Hirabayashi spoke of discrimination that confronted nearly all persons of Asian ancestry in the United States, in the decades leading up to World War II.

California State Legislature
On January 5, 2012, Assembly members Yamada and Furutani were granted unanimous consent in the California State Assembly to adjourn in memory of Gordon Hirabayashi.

Presidential Medal of Freedom

On April 27, 2012, President Barack Obama announced that Hirabayashi would receive the Presidential Medal of Freedom for his principled stand against Japanese-American internment. The President presented the award posthumously on May 29. It was accepted by his family, who traveled to Washington from Edmonton, Alberta, Canada. On February 22, 2014, the medal was formally donated to the University of Washington Library Special Collections, which holds Hirabayashi's papers.

Stage play
In 2007, the Asian American theatre company East West Players gave the world premiere of a stage play based on Hirabayashi's true life story. The play was a one-man show and was titled Dawn's Light: The Journey of Gordon Hirabayashi. East West Players described the play as follows: "During WWII in Seattle, University of Washington student Gordon Hirabayashi agonizes over U.S. government orders to forcibly remove and imprison all people of Japanese ancestry on the West Coast. As he fights to reconcile his country's betrayal with his Constitutional beliefs, Gordon journeys toward a greater understanding of America's triumphs and failures."

Dawn's Light: The Journey of Gordon Hirabayashi was written by Jeanne Sakata, directed by Jessica Kubzansky, and starred actor Ryun Yu as Gordon Hirabayashi and multiple other roles. Performances were held at the East West Player's David Henry Hwang Theatre in Little Tokyo in Los Angeles, California. Previews were November 1–4, 2007. Opening night was on November 7, 2007 and the play closed on December 2, 2007. The Los Angeles Times gave it a mixed review: "Ryun Yu plays Hirabayashi... but even his fine-grained tour de force doesn't negate the suspicion that another structure, another style might make this material more exciting."

In 2008, playwright Jeanne Sakata adapted her full-length stage play into a shorter theatre-for-youth production, which would tour the schools. Whereas the original one-man show ran approximately 90 minutes, this new abridged version, aimed at students, was about half as long, coming in at about 45 minutes. The tour was produced by East West Players' Theatre For Youth program, directed again by Jessica Kubzansky, and starred actor Martin Yu, who had been the understudy in the original 2007 full-length production.

In 2010, East West Players' Theatre For Youth program produced another tour of Dawn's Light: The Journey of Gordon Hirabayashi. There were a few revisions to the script, but the play remained approximately 45 minutes. However, there was a new director and cast, not connected to previous productions. It was directed by Leslie Ishii and starred actor Blake Kushi. This marked the first time a Japanese-American director as well as a Japanese-American actor were used. The show was well-received as indicated by the following review: "Kushi gave a one-man, tour-de-force performance that floored the audience..."

Southern California Edison was the major sponsor of this tour of Dawn's Light: The Journey of Gordon Hirabayashi. The tour ran from February 12 to March 31, 2010. Shows were performed at elementary schools, middle schools, and high schools (and one city college) and also at community centers, churches, and public libraries. There were 35 performances in total. The tour visited the following California cities: Alhambra, Baldwin Park, East Rancho Dominguez, Fullerton, Gardena, Huntington Beach, Long Beach, Los Angeles, Monterey Park, North Hollywood, Norwalk, Pasadena, Redlands, Reseda, San Bernardino, San Fernando, Van Nuys, and West Covina.

In 2011, Ryun Yu reprised his performance of Dawn's Light: The Journey of Gordon Hirabayashi, but this time in Chicago, Illinois. Silk Road Theatre Project, in association with the Department of Cultural Affairs, City of Chicago and Millennium Park, presented the one-man show at the Jay Pritzker Pavilion in Millennium Park. There were three performances total on January 13–15, 2011. The production was directed by Jessica Kubzansky and produced by Jerry O'Boyle.

In 2012, the play was renamed by its author as Hold These Truths, and prepared by the Epic Theatre Ensemble of New York City for presentation off-Broadway in prototype productions in March. Starring Joel de la Fuente, it was on the Fall schedule to run from October 21 to November 18, 2012. People's Light and Theatre Company, in Malvern, Pennsylvania, staged the play in 2014 as part of its "Community Matters" series, with de la Fuente. In 2014, Ryun Yu performed the role for Seattle's ACT Theatre. Plays & Players Theatre, in Philadelphia, presented it in 2015 with actor Makoto Hirano. In 2016, Portland Center Stage presented Hold These Truths in the Ellen Bye Studio with Ryun Yu, who originated the role of Gordon Hirabayashi in the 2007 world premiere (under the title Dawn's Light) at East West Players in Los Angeles. Other productions were mounted in New York City and in Boston in December 2017, in San Diego in November 2019, and in San Francisco in 2021 at the San Francisco Playhouse.In 2022 People's Light in Malvern PA again presented
"Hold These Truths" starring Steven Eng (www.people'slight.org>hold-these-truths)

In May of 2022, the first Canadian production of Hold These Truths was staged in the Second Playing Space at the University of Alberta in Edmonton, directed by Melanie Dreyer-Lude and starring Kevin Takahide Lee as Hirabayashi.

See also
 List of civil rights leaders

References

External links

 History Link
 Gordon K. Hirabayashi papers, 1934–2012, hosted by Archives West
 University of Washington essay 
 On the court case 
 Short biography (pdf)
 Sociology papers
 Segal, Lewis. "Theater Review:  One man's losing battle against racism:  'Dawn's Light' addresses racism in times of war, but current events undercut its impact", Los Angeles Times, 9 November 2007. Retrieved on 30 April 2010.
 Chung, Philip W. "Gordon Hirabayashi's Story Sees the Light of Dawn", AsianWeek,  San Francisco, 3 November 2007. Retrieved on 30 April 2010.
 Gordon Hirabayashi Recreation Site History
 Materials relating to the case of Gordon K. Hirabayashi, 1943, The Bancroft Library
 

1918 births
2012 deaths
American expatriate academics
American expatriates in Canada
American human rights activists
American sociologists
Canadian Quakers
Converts to Quakerism
Japanese-American civil rights activists
Japanese-American internees
American people of Japanese descent
University of Washington alumni
Academic staff of the University of Alberta
American Quakers
Scientists from Seattle
American Christian pacifists
People from Auburn, Washington
Presidential Medal of Freedom recipients